Northville High School is the public high school of Northville Public Schools located in Northville Charter Township, Michigan, with a Northville postal address.

Within Wayne County the school serves most of Northville Township and the county's portion of Northville. Within Oakland County the school serves that county's portion of Northville, as well as Novi Township, the southwestern part of the city of Novi, and a southeastern part of Lyon Charter Township. Within Washtenaw County it serves a small part of Salem Township.

History
The school opened in 1959.  As the school district population has grown throughout the years, so has the high school. 2287 students were enrolled at the beginning of the 2012–13 school year. The high school used to be located in the city of Northville itself, now the reconstructed building on that site serves as one of two middle schools within the Northville Public Schools District. With the substantial growth of the surrounding community, the district constructed a larger facility on Six Mile Road in Northville Township, south of the city—through the mailing address still says Northville. The previous building became Hillside Middle School. Two years after the construction of the new building, an extension to the east wing of the building was added.

Academics

Rankings
 In 2014, NHS was named a Silver Medal High School by U.S. News & World Report, one of 50 schools in Michigan to receive this award

Extracurricular activities

Athletics
Northville High School has teams in the following sports: football, cross country, soccer, golf, basketball, wrestling, swimming, hockey, baseball, track, tennis, lacrosse, cheerleading, pom pon, volleyball, gymnastics, and softball.  Northville High School also offers club sports teams in ultimate frisbee, hockey, rugby, bowling, figure skating, equestrian, triathlon and the Northville Rowing Club.

Publications
The yearbook Palladium is produced through a course. In 2008, the formerly discontinued newspaper, the Mustanger, was re-introduced. It was later discontinued again in favor of broadcasting, a pre-recorded newscast that now does announcements and school-wide news.

Music and the Arts
Northville High School has award-winning choir and band departments. There are 8 choirs, 3 of which are audition-based, including acapella groups Backbeat and Treblemakers. There are multiple bands as well, including a jazz band under the direction of Michael H Rumbell.

Notable alumni

Matthew Boldy, professional ice hockey player
Jake Moody, kicker for the Michigan Wolverines football team
Henry Thrun, American ice hockey player
Amy Yakima, winner of season 10 of So You Think You Can Dance

References

External links
Northville High School Official Site

 Public high schools in Michigan
 Novi, Michigan
 Education in Oakland County, Michigan
 Schools in Wayne County, Michigan
1959 establishments in Michigan